Kari Mannerla (January 9, 1930, Helsinki, Finland – July 12, 2006, Helsinki, Finland) was a Finnish board and card game designer and advertising agency executive. The most famous game designed by Mannerla is the board game Afrikan tähti (The Star of Africa), the idea of which he began to develop in 1949. The game was published two years later. Mannerla made up the name of the game when reading an article about the biggest diamond in the world, the Star of Africa, discovered in South Africa.

Apart from the board game, he also designed the Afrikan tähti card play version. He also designed the board game Inkan aarre (Treasure of the Inca) that was published in 2005. It is similar to Afrikan tähti, but takes place in South America. Earlier, Mannerla also designed solitaire card games and adventure party games.

Mannerla made a career in an advertising agency and retired as the chairman of the board of directors. He died of cancer at the age of 76.

References

External links
 Profile on boardgamegeek.com

Mannerla, Kari
Mannerla, Kari
Mannerla, Kari
Mannerla, kari
Mannerla, Kari